This is a list of Canada's 338 electoral districts as defined by the 2013 Representation Order which first came into effect for the 2015 Canadian Federal Election on October 19, 2015.

In most cases, provinces have been broken down into regions of a dozen or fewer districts; these are entirely unofficial and somewhat arbitrary.

See also List of Canadian federal electoral districts.

Newfoundland and Labrador
Avalon
Bonavista—Burin—Trinity
Coast of Bays—Central—Notre Dame
Labrador
Long Range Mountains
St. John's East 
St. John's South—Mount Pearl
Total: 7

Nova Scotia
Cape Breton—Canso
Central Nova
Cumberland—Colchester
Dartmouth—Cole Harbour
Halifax
Halifax West
Kings—Hants
Sackville—Preston—Chezzetcook
South Shore—St. Margarets
Sydney—Victoria
West Nova
Total: 11

Prince Edward Island
Cardigan
Charlottetown
Egmont
Malpeque
Total: 4

New Brunswick 
Acadie—Bathurst
Beauséjour
Fredericton
Fundy Royal
Madawaska—Restigouche
Miramichi—Grand Lake
Moncton—Riverview—Dieppe
New Brunswick Southwest
Saint John—Rothesay
Tobique—Mactaquac
Total: 10

Quebec
Eastern Quebec (5)
Avignon—La Mitis—Matane—Matapédia
Bellechasse—Les Etchemins—Lévis
Gaspésie—Les Îles-de-la-Madeleine 
Montmagny—L'Islet—Kamouraska—Rivière-du-Loup 
Rimouski-Neigette—Témiscouata—Les Basques
Côte-Nord and Saguenay (5)
Beauport—Côte-de-Beaupré—Île d'Orléans—Charlevoix 
Chicoutimi—Le Fjord
Jonquière 
Lac-Saint-Jean 
Manicouagan
Quebec City (5)
Beauport—Limoilou
Charlesbourg—Haute-Saint-Charles
Louis-Hébert
Louis-Saint-Laurent
Québec
Central Quebec (9)
Bécancour—Nicolet—Saurel
Berthier—Maskinongé
Joliette
Lévis—Lotbinière 
Montcalm
Portneuf—Jacques-Cartier
Repentigny
Saint-Maurice—Champlain
Trois-Rivières
Eastern Townships (9)
Beauce
Brome—Missisquoi
Compton—Stanstead 
Drummond
Mégantic—L'Érable
Richmond—Arthabaska
Saint-Hyacinthe—Bagot
Shefford 
Sherbrooke
Montérégie (10)
Beloeil—Chambly
Brossard—Saint-Lambert
Châteauguay—Lacolle
Longueuil—Charles-LeMoyne
Longueuil—Saint-Hubert
Montarville
Pierre-Boucher—Les Patriotes—Verchères
Saint-Jean 
Salaberry—Suroît
Vaudreuil—Soulanges 
Central Montreal (10)
Hochelaga
LaSalle—Émard—Verdun
Laurier—Sainte-Marie
Mount Royal
Notre-Dame-de-Grâce—Westmount 
Outremont 
Papineau
Rosemont—La Petite-Patrie
Saint-Léonard—Saint-Michel 
Ville-Marie—Le Sud-Ouest—Île-des-Sœurs
Suburban Montreal and Laval (13)
Alfred-Pellan
Ahuntsic-Cartierville 
Bourassa
Dorval—Lachine—LaSalle 
Honoré-Mercier
Lac-Saint-Louis
La Pointe-de-l'Île 
La Prairie
Laval—Les Îles
Marc-Aurèle-Fortin
Pierrefonds—Dollard
Saint-Laurent   
Vimy
Laurentides, Outaouais and Northern Quebec (12)
Abitibi—Baie-James—Nunavik—Eeyou
Abitibi—Témiscamingue 
Argenteuil—La Petite-Nation 
Gatineau
Hull—Aylmer
Laurentides—Labelle
Mirabel
Pontiac
Rivière-des-Mille-Îles
Rivière-du-Nord
Terrebonne 
Thérèse-De Blainville
Total: 78

Ontario
Northern Ontario (9)
Algoma—Manitoulin—Kapuskasing 
Kenora 
Nickel Belt 
Nipissing—Timiskaming 
Sault Ste. Marie 
Sudbury 
Thunder Bay—Rainy River 
Thunder Bay—Superior North 
Timmins—James Bay
Ottawa (8)
Carleton
Kanata—Carleton
Nepean
Ottawa Centre 
Orléans 
Ottawa South 
Ottawa—Vanier 
Ottawa West—Nepean
Eastern Ontario (8)
Bay of Quinte
Glengarry—Prescott—Russell
Kingston and the Islands
Lanark—Frontenac—Kingston 
Leeds—Grenville—Thousand Islands and Rideau Lakes
Hastings—Lennox and Addington 
Renfrew—Nipissing—Pembroke
Stormont—Dundas—South Glengarry
Central Ontario (9)
Barrie—Innisfil
Barrie—Springwater—Oro-Medonte
Dufferin—Caledon
Haliburton—Kawartha Lakes—Brock
Northumberland—Peterborough South
Parry Sound—Muskoka
Peterborough—Kawartha
Simcoe—Grey 
Simcoe North
Durham and York Regions (15)
Ajax
Aurora—Oak Ridges—Richmond Hill
Durham
King—Vaughan
Markham—Stouffville
Markham—Thornhill
Markham—Unionville
Newmarket—Aurora
Oshawa
Pickering—Uxbridge
Richmond Hill
Thornhill 
Vaughan—Woodbridge
Whitby
York—Simcoe
Toronto (25)
Beaches—East York
Davenport
Don Valley East
Don Valley North
Don Valley West
Eglinton—Lawrence
Etobicoke Centre 
Etobicoke—Lakeshore 
Etobicoke North
Humber River—Black Creek
Parkdale—High Park
Scarborough—Agincourt 
Scarborough Centre 
Scarborough—Guildwood 
Scarborough North (electoral district)
Scarborough—Rouge Park 
Scarborough Southwest
Spadina—Fort York 
Toronto Centre 
Toronto—Danforth
Toronto—St. Paul's 
University—Rosedale
Willowdale 
York Centre
York South—Weston
Brampton, Mississauga and Oakville (13)
Brampton Centre 
Brampton East 
Brampton North
Brampton South
Brampton West
Mississauga Centre 
Mississauga East—Cooksville 
Mississauga—Erin Mills 
Mississauga—Lakeshore
Mississauga—Malton
Mississauga—Streetsville
Oakville
Oakville North—Burlington
Hamilton, Burlington and Niagara (10)
Burlington
Flamborough—Glanbrook
Hamilton Centre 
Hamilton East—Stoney Creek 
Hamilton Mountain
Hamilton West—Ancaster—Dundas
Niagara Centre
Niagara Falls 
Niagara West
St. Catharines
Midwestern Southern Ontario (14)
Brantford—Brant
Bruce—Grey—Owen Sound
Cambridge
Guelph 
Haldimand—Norfolk 
Huron—Bruce
Kitchener Centre 
Kitchener—Conestoga 
Kitchener South—Hespeler
Milton
Oxford
Perth—Wellington
Waterloo
Wellington—Halton Hills
Southwestern Ontario (10)
Chatham-Kent—Leamington
Elgin—Middlesex—London 
Essex
Lambton—Kent—Middlesex
London—Fanshawe
London North Centre 
London West
Sarnia—Lambton
Windsor—Tecumseh
Windsor West
Total: 121

Manitoba 
Rural (6)
Brandon—Souris
Churchill—Keewatinook Aski
Dauphin—Swan River—Neepawa
Portage—Lisgar
Provencher
Selkirk—Interlake—Eastman
Winnipeg (8)
Charleswood—St. James—Assiniboia—Headingley
Elmwood—Transcona
Kildonan—St. Paul
Saint Boniface—Saint Vital
Winnipeg Centre
Winnipeg North
Winnipeg South
Winnipeg South Centre
Total: 14

Saskatchewan 
Rural (8)
Battlefords—Lloydminster
Carlton Trail—Eagle Creek
Cypress Hills—Grasslands
Desnethé—Missinippi—Churchill River
Moose Jaw—Lake Centre—Lanigan
Prince Albert
Souris—Moose Mountain
Yorkton—Melville
Regina (3)
Regina—Lewvan
Regina—Qu'Appelle
Regina—Wascana
Saskatoon (3)
Saskatoon—Grasswood
Saskatoon—University
Saskatoon West
Total: 14

Alberta 
Rural (15)
Banff—Airdrie
Battle River—Crowfoot
Bow River
Foothills
Fort McMurray—Cold Lake
Grande Prairie—Mackenzie
Lakeland
Lethbridge
Medicine Hat—Cardston—Warner
Peace River—Westlock
Red Deer—Lacombe
Red Deer—Mountain View
Sherwood Park—Fort Saskatchewan
Sturgeon River—Parkland
Yellowhead
Edmonton and environs (9)
Edmonton Centre
Edmonton Griesbach
Edmonton Manning
Edmonton Mill Woods
Edmonton Riverbend
Edmonton Strathcona
Edmonton West
Edmonton—Wetaskiwin
St. Albert—Edmonton
Calgary (10)
Calgary Centre
Calgary Confederation
Calgary Forest Lawn
Calgary Heritage
Calgary Midnapore
Calgary Nose Hill
Calgary Rocky Ridge
Calgary Shepard
Calgary Signal Hill
Calgary Skyview
 Total: 34

British Columbia
Northern Interior B.C. (3)
Cariboo—Prince George
Prince George—Peace River—Northern Rockies
Skeena—Bulkley Valley
Southern Interior B.C. (6)
Central Okanagan—Similkameen—Nicola
Kamloops—Thompson—Cariboo
Kelowna—Lake Country
Kootenay—Columbia
North Okanagan—Shuswap
South Okanagan—West Kootenay
Fraser Valley and Southern Lower Mainland (11)
Abbotsford
Chilliwack—Hope
Cloverdale—Langley City
Delta
Fleetwood—Port Kells
Langley—Aldergrove
Mission—Matsqui—Fraser Canyon
Pitt Meadows—Maple Ridge
South Surrey—White Rock
Surrey Centre
Surrey—Newton
Vancouver and Northern Lower Mainland (15)
Burnaby North—Seymour
Burnaby South
Coquitlam—Port Coquitlam
New Westminster—Burnaby
North Vancouver
Port Moody—Coquitlam
Richmond Centre
Steveston—Richmond East
Vancouver Centre
Vancouver East
Vancouver Granville 
Vancouver Kingsway
Vancouver Quadra 
Vancouver South
West Vancouver—Sunshine Coast—Sea to Sky Country
Vancouver Island (7)
Courtenay—Alberni
Cowichan—Malahat—Langford
Esquimalt—Saanich—Sooke
Nanaimo—Ladysmith
North Island—Powell River
Saanich—Gulf Islands
Victoria
Total: 42

Yukon
Yukon
Total: 1

Northwest Territories
Northwest Territories 
Total: 1

Nunavut
Nunavut
Total: 1

Elections Canada: Electoral districts